This bibliography contains a list of works by Bangladeshi poet, novelist Humayun Azad.

Poetry 
The following is a list of books of poetry by Humayun Azad arranged chronologically by first edition.

Fictions 
The following is a list of fiction books by Humayun Azad arranged chronologically by first edition.

Criticism

Linguistics

Teenage literature

Others

References

Azad, Humayun
Azad, Humayun
Bibliography